Polly With a Past may refer to:

A 1917 Broadway play by George Middleton and Guy Bolton.
A 1920 silent film based on the play.